Stuart Wilkinson may refer to:

 Stuart Wilkinson (cricketer) (born 1942), former English cricketer
 Stuart Wilkinson (rugby league) (born 1960), English rugby league football coach and former player
Stuart Wilkinson, drummer for Dumdums and Foregone Conclusion

See also
Wilkinson (surname)